In behavioral economics, willingness to pay (WTP) is the maximum price at or below which a consumer will definitely buy one unit of a product. This corresponds to the standard economic view of a consumer reservation price. Some researchers, however, conceptualize WTP as a range.

According to the constructed preference view, consumer willingness to pay is a context-sensitive construct; that is, a consumer's WTP for a product depends on the concrete decision context. For example, consumers tend to be willing to pay more for a soft drink in a luxury hotel resort in comparison to a beach bar or a local retail store.

See also 

 Cost-benefit analysis
 Welfare economics

References

Further reading 

Anderson, James C., Dipak Jain, and Pradeep K. Chintagunta (1993), "Understanding Customer Value in Business Markets: Methods of Customer Value Assessment," Journal of Business-to-Business Marketing, 1 (1), 3–30.
Breidert Christoph, Hahsler, Michael, and Reutterer (2006), "A Review of Methods for Measuring Willingness-to-Pay", Innovative Marketing, 2(4), 8–32.
Miller, Klaus M., Hofstetter, Reto, Krohmer, Harley, Zhang, John Z. (2011), "How Should Consumers' Willingness to Pay be Measured? An Empirical Comparison of State-of-the-Art Approaches", Journal of Marketing Research.
Wertenbroch, Klaus and Bernd Skiera (2002), "Measuring Consumers' Willingness to Pay at the Point of Purchase," Journal of Marketing Research, 39 (May), 228–41.

Pricing